Fanny Lye Deliver'd is a British period drama film set in 1657 on a Shropshire farm. It stars Maxine Peake, Charles Dance, and Freddie Fox, and is written and directed by Thomas Clay. It premiered in October 2019 after more than three years in post production.

Cast
Maxine Peake as Fanny Lye
Charles Dance as John Lye
Freddie Fox as Thomas Ashbury
Tanya Reynolds as Rebecca Henshaw
Peter McDonald as The High Sheriff for the Council of State
Zak Adams as Arthur Lye
Perry Fitzpatrick as The Sheriff's Deputy
Kenneth Collard as The Constable

References

External links
 

2019 films
British historical drama films
Films set in the 1650s
Films set in Shropshire
Films shot in England
2010s English-language films
2010s British films